Hua or HUA may refer to:

China 
 Hua, as in Huaxia and Zhonghua, a name of China
 Hoa people, Chinese people in Vietnam
 Hua (state), a state in ancient China, destroyed by Qin
 Hua (surname), a Chinese surname
 Hua County, in Anyang, Henan, China
 Hua County, Guangdong, now Huadu District, in Guangzhou, Guangdong, China
 Hua County, Shaanxi, now Huazhou District, in Weinan, Shaanxi, China
 Mount Hua, a mountain in Shaanxi, China

Other uses 
 Hua Islet, Wangan Township, Penghu County (the Pescadores), Taiwan (Republic of China)
 Hua language (disambiguation), a name used for several unrelated languages
 Hua's lemma, in analytic number theory
 Harkat-ul-Ansar (HuA), a Pakistan-based Islamic paramilitary organization operating primarily in Kashmir
 Heard Understood Acknowledged, possible origin of hooah, a U.S. Army battle cry
 Redstone Army Airfield in Alabama, U.S.
 Turbonilla hua, a species of sea snail in the family Pyramidellidae
 Hua (gastropod)
 Hua (plant)

See also
 An hua, in Chinese ceramics, a term meaning "secret decoration"